Bongaigaon Refinery HS School (or BGR HS School) was established on 14 June 1984 by Bongaigaon Refinery and Petrochemicals Limited inside the BGR Township. It is an Assamese medium school under the Board of Secondary Education, Assam. The Higher Secondary Section offers Science and Arts streams, the HS Section offers its courses in English. The school building is three storied and has Chemistry, Biology, and Physics laboratories on the school campus.

History 
The school was initially named BRPL Vidyalaya. It was later changed when the Bongaigaon Refinery merged with Indian Oil Corporation.

Uniform 
The school uniform is blue trousers for boys and skirts of the same color for girls, accompanied by common white shirts for both boys and girls. White trousers/skirts and shoes are worn on specific days (Nursery on Monday, Classes V - VII on Thursday and Class VII - XII on Saturday).

Results 
BGR HS School is one of the schools in the districts of Bongaigaon and Chirang.

School magazine 
The school magazine, containing work by students and teachers, is Ankur (অঙ্কুৰ).

References

High schools and secondary schools in Assam
Schools in Bongaigaon
Educational institutions established in 1984
1984 establishments in Assam